Polylepis hieronymi is a species of plant in the family Rosaceae. It is found in Argentina and Bolivia. It is threatened by habitat loss.

References

hieronymi
Flora of the Andes
Flora of Argentina
Flora of Bolivia
Páramo flora
Vulnerable plants
Taxonomy articles created by Polbot